CNN International South Asia is the South Asia subsidiary of the CNN International pay-TV cable network targeted toward India, Pakistan, Bangladesh, Sri Lanka, Nepal, Bhutan, and Maldives.

Programmes
 African Start Up
 African Voices
 Amanpour
 Anderson Cooper 360°
 Business Traveller
 CNN Freedom Project
 CNN Newsroom
 CNN Presents
 CNN Today
 CNN Tonight
 CNNGo
 Cold War
 Connect the World with Becky Anderson
 Eco Solutions
 Erin Burnett Outfront
 Fareed Zakaria GPS
 i Report for CNN
 Inside India
 Inside the Middle East
 International Desk with Robyn Curnow
 Living Golf
 MainSail
 Marketplace Europe
 Marketplace Middle East
 News Stream
 Open Court
 Quest Means Business
 Smerconish
 State of the Union
 TalkAsia
 Vital Signs with Dr. Sanjay Gupta
 Winning Post
 Hala Gorani Tonight
 World Sport

Controversies
In 2017, a retired Liutenant General and now a frequent TV news analyst and commentatator, Talat Masood told CNN International about Pakistan's nuclear capabilities and nuclear deterrent against any attacks on the country.

In October 2018, the Supreme Court of Pakistan directed the Pakistan Electronic Media Regulatory Authority (PEMRA) to issue directives to all foreign channels broadcasting in Pakistan to make them aware that, under the existing Pakistani law, they are not permitted to have more than 10 per cent foreign content. This law's purpose was to have the foreign channels focus on local news events also, rather than rehash and rerun broadcasts of American and European TV programs.

See also 
 HBO (India)
 WB Channel

References

CNN
English-language television stations in India
24-hour television news channels in India
Network18 Group
Warner Bros. Discovery Asia-Pacific
Television channels and stations established in 1989
1989 establishments in Delhi